Nicholasville is a home rule city in and the county seat of Jessamine County, Kentucky. The population was 31,490 during the 2020 U.S. census, making Nicholasville the 10th-largest settlement in the state.

Since the late 20th century, Nicholasville has undergone rapid growth; the population increased 440.23% between 1970 and 2020. The city serves as both a residential area for Lexington-area commuters and as an employment and shopping center for central Kentucky.

History
Nicholasville was founded by European Americans in 1798, after the American Revolutionary War, and incorporated in 1837. The town was named in honor of Colonel George Nicholas, a father of the Kentucky Constitution in 1792.
The Young House in Nicholasville is listed on the National Register of Historic Places.

The city has grown rapidly since the late 20th century and is working to accommodate new highways and transportation needs. Many residents commute to Lexington for work. Others are part of building Nicholasville as a center of retail services for the county.

Geography
The city serves as a logistics and commuter hub between Lexington and Nicholasville's neighboring counties, especially Garrard County. Some artificial ponds, including Lake Mingo (named after the Native American Mingo people), are present in the city. Town Fork, a partially channelized stream, runs south and passes underneath downtown, eventually draining into Jessamine Creek.

Climate
Nicholasville is in the northern periphery of the humid subtropical climate zone, with hot and humid summers, cool winters, and occasional mild periods, especially in autumn. The city and the surrounding Bluegrass region have four distinct seasons that include cool plateau breezes, moderate nights in the summer, and no prolonged periods of rain, snow, or other severe weather.

Demographics

As of the 2020 census, there were 31,490 people, 11,244 households, and 7,503 families residing in the city. The racial makeup of the city was 89.8%% White (87.5% non-Hispanic), 5.2% African American, 0.1% Native American, 1.4% Asian, 0.0% Pacific Islander, 1.2% from other races, and 2.6% from two or more races. Hispanics or Latinos of any race were 3.5% of the population.

There were 11,244 households, out of which 25.6% had children under the age of 18 living with them, 49.2% were married couples living together, 16.7% had a female householder with no husband present, 5.6% had a male householder with no wife present, and 26.5% were non-families. 22.3% of all households were made up of individuals, and 7.4% had someone living alone who was 65 years of age or older. The average household size was 2.64 and the average family size was 3.07.

The age distribution was 27.9% under the age of 18, 8.8% from 18 to 24, 30.7% from 25 to 44, 22.8% from 45 to 64, and 9.8% who were 65 years of age or older. The median age was 33.1 years. For every 100 females, there were 91.1 males. For every 100 females age 18 and over, there were 86.9 males.

According to Census Bureau data for 2011 from the American Community Survey's five-year estimates, the median income for a household in the city was $43,453, and the median income for a family was $52,419. Full-time male workers had a median income of $37,954 versus $33,330 for females. The per capita income for the city was $19,526. About 14.5% of families and 17.1% of the population were below the poverty line, including 22.7% of those under age 18 and 6.5% of those age 65 or over.

Arts and culture
The city is home to the Kentucky Wine and Vine Fest. The annual festival showcases wines from commercial vineyards and amateur winemakers from across Kentucky and the surrounding region. In 2014, it was named as the "Official Wine Festival of Kentucky" by the Kentucky General Assembly. Nicholasville is near Camp Nelson Heritage National Monument and Camp Nelson National Cemetery.

Government

The Nicholasville government operates under a non-partisan city commission, which exercises both executive and legislative powers. The commission is composed of a mayor and four commissioners; all are elected at-large, requiring each candidate to gain the support of the majority of the electorate. In addition, the four commissioners are elected to manage particular city departments. They serve two-year terms; the mayor is elected to a four-year term. The commission wields all executive, legislative, and administrative powers.

In 2012, there was a proposal on the ballot to change the form of city government to that of a mayor–council government, in order to separate the legislative and executive functions, but the proposal was defeated.

Commissioners draft and pass laws and, by managing their respective departments, ensure the laws are carried out efficiently. The mayor administers oaths, signs documents on the city's behalf, and conducts commission meetings. As a member of the commission, the mayor has legislative powers equal to that of the commissioners. Commission meetings take place twice monthly.

Education
Jessamine County Schools provides public education.  Nicholasville Elementary School is located in the city. Students go to schools in the county for middle and high school grades.

The Hattie C. Warner Elementary School on Wilmore Road is named after local teacher Hattie Catherine Warner (1886-1963) who taught for 46 years in Jessamine County. She graduated from Eastern Kentucky University in 1913 and is buried in the Maple Grove cemetery.

Nicholasville has a lending library, the Jessamine County Public Library.

Infrastructure

Transportation

U.S. highways
 U.S. Route 27 is a major north–south artery. A four-lane arterial highway with a center-turning lane serves drivers from the Lexington city limits to the Business US 27 intersection north of the city center. US 27 diverts to the western edge of the city center on a four-lane, controlled-access bypass and continues south of the city toward the Kentucky River.

State routes
 Kentucky Route 29 is an east–west two-lane highway that stretches from the western fringes of the city west of the U.S. 27 bypass to Business U.S. 27 in downtown Nicholasville. It is known as Wilmore Road west of U.S. 27 and east of Maple Street.
 Kentucky Route 39 is a north–south highway that stretches from the farms south of the city before concluding at Business U.S. 27 at downtown. It is known as Maple Street, and as Sulphur Well Road and then Lancaster Road.
 Kentucky Route 169 is an east–west highway that cuts through the city center. It has intersections with U.S. 27 and Business U.S. 27. It is known as Keene Road northwest of the city center, then 3rd Street, Richmond Road and Union Mills Road on the east side.
 Kentucky Route 1980 is known as Ash Grove Road and travels into Fayette County to the east. It departs from U.S. 27 just south of the Lexington city limits.
 Kentucky Route 3375 traverses west of U.S. 27, north of the city center, and is known as Catnip Hill Road.

Notable people
Cheryl Avioli, former member of the New York State Public Service Commission
Donald Brumfield, jockey
Charles K. Duncan, U.S. Navy admiral
Danny Fargo, professional wrestler
Chris Holtmann, Ohio State men's basketball coach
Lee Thomas Miller, country songwriter
John Michael Montgomery, musician
Lena Madesin Phillips, lawyer
John C. Watts, U.S. Representative
Bennett H. Young, Confederate officer involved in the St. Albans Raid
Richard J. Corman, founder of R.J Corman Railroad Group

References

External links
 Welcome to Nicholasville.org - The Official Website of Nicholasville, Kentucky

Cities in Jessamine County, Kentucky
Cities in Kentucky
County seats in Kentucky
Lexington–Fayette metropolitan area
Populated places established in 1798
Populated places established in 1837